Andrew Cameron Locke is an Australian business director, investor, entrepreneur, software programmer and champion sailor. Locke originally established his reputation as managing director of Able Computing in Papua New Guinea and recently in Fiji and Australia. He has expanded his business interests into Australia through shopping centre retail establishments, warehousing/distribution and online business plus into the Philippines with full ownership in the Marand group of companies that are hoteliers, construct high rise and low rise buildings and manage student accommodation facilities.

Early life
Locke was born at Parramatta NSW, Australia in 1962 to parents Stanley and Christina Locke both Scottish Migrants who settled in Australia in 1955 from Hong Kong. His father Stanley Benjamin Locke served as a British Commando with the 3rd Commando Brigade, Number 4 troop of number 1 Commando in Burma during WW2, he survived the Battle of Hill 170 where the troop leader was awarded a Victoria cross and where 50% of the 24 man troop were killed. After the war he worked in Hong Kong as a revenue officer with the dept of Imports and Exports in the British Colonial Civil Service.

Locke spent his early and teenage years in Blacktown NSW, playing soccer for the Blacktown Spartans and Rugby league with Doonside RLFC. He was the junior golf champion at Ashlar Golf Club in 1979 and 1980.

In 1977 Locke completed grade 10 at Doonside High School and in 1978 commenced a scholarship with the Dept. of Civil Aviation (DCA), he completed his trainee ship in 1981 and graduated with a diploma in electronics and communications from the North Sydney Institute of TAFE in 1981. He attended the NSW University undertaking a degree in Electrical engineering. After completing training he became a radio technical officer at Sydney's Kingsford Smith Airport. In 1985 he was seconded to the Dept of Civil Aviation in Papua New Guinea as a senior technical instructor at the Department of Civil Aviation's Training College in Port Moresby, Papua New Guinea. Locke was head instructor of the civil aviation training college from 1986 to 1988. In 1988 he was employed by Wang computers in Port Moresby, PNG as a computer hardware engineer. In 1990 he took over Wang's software division and became lead programmer and systems analyst.

Personal life
Locke married Marijun Costales Madayag a Filipina in 1992, they have two children, adopted daughter, Allysha Mae Locke born 2008. Locke has a son, Ricky Locke with Marianne Tamati who was born in 1987. The family returned to Brisbane, Australia in 2005. It was at Wang Computers where he met Marijun Locke in 1991.

In 2007 he obtained a recreation aviation pilots licence from free flying at Redcliffe, QLD.

He competed in the 1985 and 1987 Sydney to Hobart and Southern cross yacht races, the 1986 Sydney to Coffs Harbour yacht race, numerous Cairns to Port Moresby yacht races and numerous club events over a two decades.

He is an avid Hobie cat sailor and up to 2016 was still competing in club events and state and national championships.

Business ventures
Locke and Marijun started their first business named, Computer Spot, in 1993 in Port Moresby and acquired Able computing from Pacific Industries in 1996, they merged both companies in 2000 to operate under the Able Computing name. They opened branch offices in Lae, Goroka, Madang, Kimbe, Kokopo, Alotau and Mt Hagen over the coming years. In 2013 they opened a branch of Able Computing in Suva, Fiji followed by two more stores in Lautoka and Nadi in 2014. In 2013 they opened a retail store in Richlands Queensland, Australia. In 2013 the stores in Fiji and PNG were re-branded to Able home and office.

Other investments and developments include Marand resort and spa in Bauang, La Union Philippines. The resort includes a 4 star hotel, 2 function halls, spa, water slides, pools, gym and restaurant. They designed and developed the Villa Marand which is a two-stage town house and lot development of 200 town houses at Bauang, La Union Philippines.

They completed a high rise building in Baguio, Philippines in 2012 and currently operate their Marand Nest student accommodation business from this 9 story building. They have completed numerous house and lot projects in Australia.

Current building projects include an education and 80 room student accommodation facility capable of housing 300 students at Richlands Queensland, Australia. This facility will offer a certificate 3 in aged care. Another ten story student accommodation building in Baguio, Philippines, a 4,000 square metre office and retail building in Port Moresby, PNG and 8 apartments with a commercial building in Madang, PNG.

In 2016 Able home and office opened 12 stores in Brisbane as part of their expansion into Australia. This expansion saw the company diversify into white and brown goods. They joined up with the buying group Bi-Rite to gain access to the lucrative white goods and small appliances industry.
Things haven't gone to well and there are now only 4 stores still open.

The associated companies employed in excess of 400 staff in 2016.

Sporting
Locke was a junior golfing champion and represented his local club as the head of his pennants team.

Locke is a keen and accomplished sailor. He was introduced to sailing when he moved to Cronulla, NSW in 1980. It was only after moving to PNG that he sailed yachts.

He was president of the Papua New Guinea yachting association from 1991 until 1997. He competed in the 1985 and 1987 Sydney to Hobart, Sydney to Coffs Harbours 1986, Cairns to Port Moresby 1987, 1988 and 1992 and Brisbane to Gladstone 2011 and 2012 yacht races. Locke represented PNG in the 1991 and 2003 South Pacific games Hobie 16 sailing team, winning a team 2nd and 3rd place respectively. He has competed in three Hobie 16 world titles and finished a high of third place in Fiji in 2007. He has numerous podium finishes in past Philippines Hobie Challenges.

He is a past PNG, Philippines and Fiji Hobie 16 national champion. He had the honour to carry the batton for the 2006 Melbourne commonwealth games in Port Moresby, PNG.

Philanthropy
The Locke's are financial supporters of the efforts of the Salvation Army at Inala, Queensland. They have established the Locke foundation in the Philippines to fund high achieving students to attend university.

Notes

Australian business executives
1962 births
Living people